Lophotettix is a genus of South American groundhoppers or pygmy grasshopper. There are about five described species in Lophotettix.

Species
These five species belong to the genus Lophotettix:
 Lophotettix alticristatus Hancock, 1909
 Lophotettix brevicristatus Hancock, 1909 - type species (Brazil)
 Lophotettix hancocki (Bruner, 1910)
 Lophotettix unicristatus Hancock, 1909
 Lophotettix zumbadoi Barranco, 2010

References

Further reading

 

Tetrigidae